Weekend Festival is a music festival taking place in Hämeenlinna, previously also in Helsinki, Stockholm and Pärnu. The festival was organised for the first time in Luukki, Espoo (about 25 km from the centre of Helsinki), Finland on the 17 and 18 of August 2012. In 2013 the festival location was changed to its old location at Kyläsaari/Kalasatama in Helsinki.
In 2018 the festival moved to Hietaniemi also in Helsinki. In 2019 it moved to Suvilahti, Helsinki. Weekend Festival artist line up has mainly consisted of EDM artists but there have also been artists from other music genres present. The festival has been attended by more than 40,000 people on both years. Every year the festival has a different theme which reflects mainly in the visual side of the festival. In 2013 the festival theme was Space and Future while for 2014 the organisers decided to go with Electro Disco theme. The festival lineup has featured various internationally acclaimed artists including Skrillex, David Guetta, Calvin Harris, Martin Garrix  etc. and Finland's own popular artists. Weekend Festival has sold out in advance on both years. In 2013 Weekend Festival was voted as the best summer festival by the listeners of Finnish radio station YleX. In 2015, Weekend Festival expanded to Pärnu, Estonia and in 2016 to Sweden.

Festival area

The first Weekend Festival took place in Luukki, Espoo in 2012. Luukki Recreational Area is located 23 km from the centre of Helsinki, Finland. The heart of Luukki, which is one of the most popular outdoor recreation areas in the Helsinki region, is an old manor. The area includes 20 hectares of forest inhabited by flying squirrels. The festival area featured three stages: NRJ Stage, Weekend Stage and Party Stage. There was also a camping area.

Following the traffic difficulties in 2012, the festival was moved from the green Luukki forests to a more urban Kyläsaari/Kalasatama Festival area in 2013. The festival area in Kyläsaari/Kalasatama is four metro stops away from the Helsinki Railway Station and also easily reachable on bus, bike or foot. Kalasatama Festival area has hosted in past various bigger concerts and festivals including Sonisphere 2011, Foo Fighters and Green Day. Weekend Festival 2013 had four stages: NRJ Stage, Weekend Stage (tent), Future Stage and Galaxy Stage. Future Stage was located at the Kyläsaari harbour. The festival area in Kyläsaari does not feature a camping ground.

In 2015, Weekend Festival Baltic also took place on Pärnu beach, Estonia, with three stages. The last festival in Estonia took place in 2018. On 27.02.2019 the Weekend Festival Baltic OÜ, the organizer of the Estonian festival, was declared bankruptcy.

In 2018 the festival moved to Hietaniemi beach and expanded to a 3-day festival.

In 2020, due to the corona pandemic, Weekend Festival 2020, planned to Käpylä Sports Park in Helsinki, was canceled.

Weekend Festival line-ups

2012

2013 (Future Space Edition)

2014 (Electro Disco Edition)

2015 (Super Digital Edition)

2016 (Year of the Tiger Edition)

2017 (Neon Dreams Edition)

2018

Weekend Festival Baltic line-ups

2015 (Super Digital Edition)

2016 (Year of the Tiger Edition)

2017 (Neon Beach Edition)

Weekend Festival Sweden line-ups

2016 (Year of the Tiger Edition)

Awards
Weekend Festival was nominated for Best Festival award in Music & Media Industry Awards in 2013.

Finnish radio station YleX listeners voted Weekend Festival as the best festival of the summer in Finland in 2013. Weekend Festival gathered 25% of the total votes.

Weekend Festival was also nominated as the Best Medium-sized Festival in 2013 at European Festival Awards.

See also

List of electronic music festivals

References

Music festivals established in 2012
Electronic music festivals in Finland
Summer events in Finland